Michael "Mick" D. Shoebottom (24 December 1944 – 12 October 2002), also known by the nickname "Shoey", was an English professional rugby league footballer who played in the 1960s and 1970s.

Playing career

International honours
Mick Shoebottom won caps for England while at Leeds in 1968 against Wales, in 1969 against France (sub), in 1970 against Wales, and France, and won caps for Great Britain while at Leeds in the 1968 Rugby League World Cup against Australia, and New Zealand (sub) (1-try), in 1969 against France, in 1970 against Australia (2 matches), Australia (sub), and New Zealand, in the 1970 Rugby League World Cup against Australia, France, New Zealand, and Australia, and in 1971 against France.

Challenge Cup Final appearances
Mick Shoebottom played  in Leeds' 11–10 victory over Wakefield Trinity in the 1968 Challenge Cup "Watersplash" final during the 1967-68 season at Wembley Stadium, London on Saturday 11 May 1968.

County Cup Final appearances
Mick Shoebottom played  in Leeds' 2–18 defeat by Wakefield Trinity in the 1964 Yorkshire County Cup Final during the 1964–65 season at Fartown Ground, Huddersfield on Saturday 31 October 1964, and played  in the 22–11 victory over Castleford in the 1968 Yorkshire County Cup Final during the 1968–69 season at Belle Vue, Wakefield on Saturday 19 October 1968, played  in the 23–7 victory over Featherstone Rovers in the 1970 Yorkshire County Cup Final during the 1970–71 season at Odsal Stadium, Bradford on Saturday 21 November 1970.

BBC2 Floodlit Trophy Final appearances
Mick Shoebottom played  in Leeds' 9–5 victory over St. Helens in the 1970 BBC2 Floodlit Trophy Final during the 1970–71 season at Headingley Rugby Stadium, Leeds on Tuesday 15 December 1970.

Club career
While playing for Leeds during the 1970–71 Championship semi-final against Salford at Headingley, Mick Shoebottom dived to score a try and was subsequently carried unconscious from the field, having been caught on the head by the boot of Colin Dixon. Although paralysed for a time, Mick Shoebottom made an arduous recovery that enabled him to live a near normal life, but he would never play rugby league again.

Testimonial match
Mick Shoebottom's Testimonial match at Leeds took place in 1972.

References

External links
Obituary in The Independent
Image "Paul Litton - Paul Litten dashes between two Leeds defenders at Odsal Stadium - 13/12/1969" at rlhp.co.uk
Rugby Cup Final 1968
Profile at leedsrugby.dnsupdate.co.uk

1944 births
2002 deaths
England national rugby league team players
English rugby league players
Great Britain national rugby league team players
Leeds Rhinos players
People from Hunslet
Rugby league centres
Rugby league five-eighths
Rugby league fullbacks
Rugby league halfbacks
Rugby league players from Leeds
Yorkshire rugby league team players